Svein Grøndalen (born 8 February 1955) is a Norwegian former footballer.

He was born in Halden, and as a youngster he lived in Halden, Drammen, Halden again, and Hunndalen. He played youth football for Kvik Halden and Raufoss, and senior football for Raufoss, Rosenborg, Moss and Ås. In total he got 77 caps for Norway, between 1973 and 1984.

Grøndalen played left back or central defender, and was noted for his "physical" style of play. Many people remember him best for a brutal tackle which injured Swede Ralf Edström during a 1977 international match. He is also remembered for missing a World Cup qualification match due to a bizarre injury, while running in the forest before the game Grøndalen ran into a moose and injured himself so badly he couldn't play the next game.

He took education at the Norwegian Institute of Technology.

References

Svein Grøndalen  on Playerhistory.com

1955 births
Living people
People from Halden
Sportspeople from Gjøvik
Norwegian footballers
Norway international footballers
Raufoss IL players
Rosenborg BK players
Moss FK players
Eliteserien players
Norwegian Institute of Technology alumni
Association football defenders